Moottörin Jyrinä is a children's heavy metal band from Helsinki, Finland.

Moottörin Jyrinä plays cover songs from classic 1980s heavy metal songs (from such bands as Iron Maiden, Motörhead, and Ozzy Osbourne), with new, child-friendly Finnish language lyrics. Most of the lyrics have an educational tone. The band appears in both children's and adults' events.

The name of the band is a parody of Motörhead. The first umlaut is gratuitous, though the second is not. In proper grammatical Finnish the name would be "Moottorin jyrinä".

Discography
 Peikot (2015, VLMedia Oy)
 Metallimyrsky (2011, VL-musiikki)
 Nupit Luoteeseen - ep (2011, VL-musiikki)
 Lapsimetallin kuninkaat (2010, VL-musiikki)

Members

 Marko Skou - vocals, bass
 Esa Orjatsalo - guitar, background vocals
 Jaakko Halttunen - guitar, background vocals
 Jani Landen - drums

Former members
 Janne Hirvonen - vocals (quit the band in 2005)
 Harri Tuhkio - drums (quit the band in 2006)
 Kimmo Kovanen - guitar (quit the band in 2008)
 Aleksi Parviainen - vocals (2005 - 2012)
 Samuli Federley - guitar, background vocals (2008 - 2014)
 Markus Hellas - keyboards (2008 - 2014)

See also
 Hevisaurus

References

Finnish heavy metal musical groups